Drumcondra is a wealthy residential bayside suburb of Geelong, Victoria, Australia, overlooking Corio Bay. It is the smallest suburb in Geelong and one of the smallest in Victoria. It was named after Drumcondra, which is an inner suburb of Dublin, Ireland.

Its boundaries are the Melbourne Road, Glenleith Avenue, The Esplanade and Bell Parade. It is classified as a "block" with its main road being Beach Parade, with only 9 streets in total and around 200 houses. Some of Geelong's most-prized and valuable real estate is located along here.

The area was established with the first house built on the site of 5 Glenleith Avenue in April 1912. The houses then were continued to be built on that street in that year, making 2012 their 100th anniversary.

The mansion Lunan House is located in the suburb, built of Barrabool sandstone  for wool merchant James Strahan in 1849. In later years it became a teachers college, before being converted back to a private house. The house is listed on the Victorian Heritage Register.

References

External links
 City of Greater Geelong - Drumcondra

Suburbs of Geelong